Modern Arabic may refer to:
Modern Standard Arabic
living varieties of Arabic

See also
 Arabic (disambiguation)